The Maranhão River is a river of Goiás state in central Brazil.

See also
List of rivers of Goiás

References

Brazilian Ministry of Transport

Rivers of Federal District (Brazil)
Rivers of Goiás
Rivers of Tocantins